"Whole Lotta Lovin" is a song by American hip hop producer DJ Mustard and American rapper Travis Scott. It was released as a single on January 8, 2016, by Roc Nation and Pu$haz Ink.

Music video
The music video of the song was released on YouTube on January 11, 2016. In the video, Travis Scott was in the same place with Mustard, on the road and at the party. The video talks about love of a blonde hair girl and love of a lesbian couple.

Charts

Certifications

References

External links

2016 songs
2016 singles
Mustard (record producer) songs
Travis Scott songs
Roc Nation singles
LGBT-related songs
Song recordings produced by Mustard (record producer)
Songs written by Mustard (record producer)
Songs written by Travis Scott
Hip house songs